The Okavango Delta (or Okavango Grassland; formerly spelled "Okovango" or "Okovanggo") in Botswana is a swampy inland delta formed where the Okavango River reaches a tectonic trough at an altitude of 930–1,000 m in the central part of the endorheic basin of the Kalahari. All the water reaching the delta is ultimately evaporated and transpired and does not flow into any sea or ocean. Some flood waters drain into Lake Ngami. The area was once part of Lake Makgadikgadi, an ancient lake that had mostly dried up by the early Holocene.

The Moremi Game Reserve, a national park, is on the eastern side of the delta. The delta was named as one of the Seven Natural Wonders of Africa, which were officially declared on 11 February 2013 in Arusha, Tanzania.  On 22 June 2014, the Okavango Delta became the 1000th site to be officially inscribed on the UNESCO World Heritage List.

Geography

Floods

The Okavango is produced by seasonal flooding. The Okavango River drains the summer (January–February) rainfall from the Angola highlands and the surge flows  in around one month. The waters then spread over the  area of the delta over the next four months (March–June). The high temperature of the delta causes rapid transpiration and evaporation, resulting in 3 cycles of rising and falling water level that were not fully understood until the early 20th century. The flood peaks between June and August, during Botswana's dry winter months, when the delta swells to three times its permanent size, attracting animals from kilometres around and creating one of Africa’s greatest concentrations of wildlife.

The delta is very flat, with less than  variation in height across its , while the water drops about 60 m from Mohembo to Maun.

Water flow

Lagoons

When the water levels gradually recede, water remains in major canals and river beds, in waterholes and in a number of larger lagoons, which then attract increasing numbers of animals. Photo-safari camps and lodges are found near some of these lagoons. Among the larger lagoons are:
 Dombo Hippo Pool
 Gcodikwe Lagoon
 Guma Lagoon
 Jerejere Lagoon/Hippo Pool
 Moanachira Lagoon/Sausage Island
 Moanachira Lagoon
 Shinde Lagoon
 Xakanaxa Lagoon
 Xhamu Lagoon
 Xhobega Lagoon
 Xugana Lagoon
 Zibadiania Lagoon

Salt islands
The agglomeration of salt around plant roots leads to barren white patches in the centre of many of the thousands of islands, which have become too salty to support plants, aside from the odd salt-resistant palm tree. Trees and grasses grow in the sand around the edges of the islands that have not become too salty yet.

About 70% of the islands began as termite mounds (often Macrotermes spp.), where a tree then takes root on the mound of soil.

Chief's Island
Historically, it was reserved as an exclusive hunting area for the chief, but is now a protected area for wildlife. It now provides the core area for much of the resident wildlife when the waters rise.

Climate 

The Delta's profuse greenery is not the result of a wet climate; rather, it is an oasis in an arid country.

From March to May, the temperature reduces, with a maximum of  during the day and mild to cool nights. The rains quickly dry up leading into the dry, cool winter months of June to August. Daytime temperatures at this time of year are mild to warm, but the temperature falls considerably after sunset. Nights can be cold in the delta, with temperatures barely above freezing.

The September to November span has the heat and atmospheric pressure build up once more, as the dry season slides into the rainy season. October is the most challenging month for visitors: daytime temperatures often push past  and the dryness is only occasionally broken by a sudden cloudburst.

Fauna of the delta

The Okavango Delta is both a permanent and seasonal home to a wide variety of wildlife which is now a popular tourist attraction. All of the big five game animals—the lion, leopard, African buffalo, African bush elephant and rhinoceros (both black and white rhinoceros)—are present.

Other species include giraffe, blue wildebeest, plains zebra, hippopotamus, impala, common eland, greater kudu, sable antelope, roan antelope, puku, lechwe, waterbuck, sitatunga, tsessebe, cheetah, African wild dog, spotted hyena, black-backed jackal, caracal, serval, aardvark, aardwolf, bat-eared fox, African savanna hare, honey badger, crested porcupine, common warthog, chacma baboon, vervet monkey and Nile crocodile.

The delta also hosts over 400 bird species, including the helmeted guineafowl, African fish eagle, Pel's fishing owl, Egyptian goose, South African shelduck, African jacana, African skimmer, marabou stork, crested crane, African spoonbill, African darter, southern ground hornbill, wattled crane, lilac-breasted roller, secretary bird, and common ostrich. Prime bird-watching areas are those with a mix of habitats such as the panhandle, the seasonal delta and the parts of the Moremi Game Reserve that are close to the water.

Since 2005, the protected area has been considered a Lion Conservation Unit together with Hwange National Park.

The most populous large mammal is the lechwe, with estimates suggesting approximately 88,000 individuals. The lechwe a bit larger than an impala, with elongated hooves and a water-repellent substance on its legs that enable rapid movement through knee-deep water. Lechwe graze on aquatic plants and, like the waterbuck, take to water when threatened by predators. Only the males have horns.

Fish
The Okavango Delta is home to 71 fish species, including the tigerfish, species of tilapia, and various species of catfish. Fish sizes range from the  African sharptooth catfish to the  sickle barb. The same species are  found in the Zambezi River, indicating an historic link between the two river systems.

Flora of the delta
The Okavango Delta is home to 1068 plants which belong to 134 families and 530 genera. There are five important plant communities in the perennial swamp: Papyrus cyperus in the deeper waters, Miscanthus in the shallowly flooded sites, and Phragmites australis, Typha capensis and Pycreus in between. The swamp-dominant species, which are usually found in the perennial swamp, also extend far into the seasonally inundated area. Papyrus cyperus reeds beds grow best in slow flowing waters of medium depth and are prominent at the channel sides. On the islands and mainlands edges above the flooded grasslands different communities of flora are found. These species are located according to their water preference: for instance Philenoptera violacea requires little water, is found at the highest elevations in the perennial swamps, and is common on drier seasonal swamp islands. Trees restricted to islands within the perennial swamp are a mixture of the palm Hyphaene petersiana and acacia.

The mainland in the delta is characterized by mosaic of grassland and woodland communities composed of trees, shrubs and understory herbs, basically the vegetation is notably drier than the swamp. Acacia, Boscia, Combretum and Terminalia are some of the principal genera which make up the majority of plants within the Okavango Delta. The natural phenomenon of the annual flood in the dry season and the distinct rainy season in time of low rain is the result of the exceptionally high plant diversity within the delta.

The plants of the delta play an important role in providing cohesion for the sand. The banks or levees of a river normally have a high mud content, and this combines with the sand in the river’s load to continuously build up the river banks. The river’s load In the delta consists almost entirely of sand, because the clean waters of the Okavango contain little mud. The plants capture the sand, acting as the glue and making up for the lack of mud, and in the process creating further islands on which more plants can take root.

This process is not important in the formation of linear islands. They are long and thin and often curved like a gently meandering river because they are actually the natural banks of old river channels which have become blocked up by plant growth and sand deposition, resulting in the river changing course and the old river levees becoming islands. Due to the flatness of the delta and the large tonnage of sand flowing into it from the Okavango River, the floor of the delta is slowly but constantly rising. Where channels are today, islands will be tomorrow and then new channels may wash away these existing islands.

People

The Okavango Delta peoples consist of five ethnic groups, each with its own ethnic identity and language. The Hambukushu, Dceriku, and Wayeyi have traditionally engaged in mixed economies of millet/sorghum agriculture, fishing, hunting, the collection of wild plant foods, and pastoralism.

The Hambukushu, Dceriku, and Bugakhwe are present along the Okavango River in Angola and in the Caprivi Strip of Namibia, and  small numbers of Hambukushu and Bugakhwe are in Zambia, as well. Within the Okavango Delta, over the past 150 years or so, Hambukushu, Dceriku, and Bugakhwe have inhabited the panhandle and the Magwegqana in the northeastern delta.  have inhabited the panhandle and the area along the Boro River through the delta, as well as the area along the Boteti River.

The Wayeyi have inhabited the area around Seronga as well as the southern delta around Maun, and a few Wayeyi live in their putative ancestral home in the Caprivi Strip. Within the past 20 years many people from all over the Okavango have migrated to Maun, the late 1960s and early 1970s over 4,000 Hambukushu refugees from Angola were settled in the area around Etsha in the western Panhandle.

The Okavango Delta has been under the political control of the Batawana (a Tswana nation) since the late 18th century. Led by the house of Mathiba I, the leader of a Bangwato offshoot, the Batawana established complete control over the delta in the 1850s as the regional ivory trade exploded. Most Batawana, however, have traditionally lived on the edges of the delta, due to the threat that the tsetse fly poses to their cattle. During a hiatus of some 40 years, the tsetse fly retreated and most Batawana lived in the swamps from 1896 through the late 1930s. Since then, the edge of the delta has become increasingly crowded with its growing human and livestock populations.

Molapos (water streams)
After the flooding season, the waters in the lower parts of the delta, near the base, recede, leaving moisture behind in the soil. This residual moisture is used for planting fodder and other crops that can thrive on it. This land is locally known as molapo.

During  1974 to 1978, the floods were more intensive than normal and flood recession cropping was not possible, so severe food and fodder shortages occurred. In response, the Molapo Development Project was initiated. It protected the molapo areas with bunds to control the flooding and prevent severe flooding. The bunds are provided with sluice gates so the stored water can be released and flood recession cropping can start.

Possible threats 
One possible threat is oil exploration by Canadian company ReconAfrica. Initial exploration in April 2021 revealed oil deposits in sedimentary rock. Environmentalists are concerned that the project will have a negative ecological impact and that some of the main bodies of water could be threatened.  
ReconAfrica has stated, "There will be no damage to the ecosystem from the planned activities." 

The Namibian government has presented plans to build a hydropower station in the Zambezi Region, which would regulate the Okavango's flow to some extent. While proponents argue that the effect would be minimal, environmentalists argue that this project could destroy most of the rich animal and plant life in the delta. Other threats include local human encroachment and regional extraction of water in both Angola and Namibia.

South African filmmaker and conservationist Rick Lomba warned in the 1980s of the threat of cattle invasion to the area. His documentary The End of Eden portrayed his lobbying on behalf of the delta.

The Okavango catchment is projected to experience decreasing annual rainfall as well as increasing temperatures as a result of global warming. The effects of global warming are likely to result in reductions in the extent of floodplains in the Okavango Delta, which will have significant impacts on water availability as well as livestock rearing and agricultural activities in the region.

See also

 Kalahari Basin

References

Further reading

External links 

 Conservation International
 Okavango Delta concession areas
 Flow : information for Okavango Delta planning is the weblog of the Library of the Harry Oppenheimer Okavango Research Institute
 The Ngami Times is Ngamiland's weekly newspaper
 Official Botswana Government site on Moremi Game Reserve, inside the Okavango Delta
 Wild Entrust International
 Seven Natural Wonders of Africa
 Discovery Channel - Kalahari Flood
 Flood-recession cropping in the molapos of the Okavango Delta
 Okavango Research Institute
 Current Okavango water levels, weather data and satellite images
 1986 Documentary The End of Eden by Rick Lomba
 Southern African Game Reserves - Okavango Delta

River deltas of Africa
Wetlands of Botswana
Swamps of Africa
Floodplains of Africa
Ramsar sites in Botswana
World Heritage Sites in Botswana
Zambezian flooded grasslands
Kalahari Desert
First 100 IUGS Geological Heritage Sites